The Cernavodă Bridge is a complex of two freeway-railroad truss bridges in Romania, across the Danube River, connecting the cities of Cernavodă and Fetești, between the regions of Dobruja and Muntenia.

The Cernavodă Bridge lies on the A2 Sun Motorway, in the vicinity of the old Anghel Saligny Bridge. Across the railway bridge runs the CFR Line 800, connecting Bucharest to the ports of Constanța and Mangalia on the Black Sea.

See also
 A2 motorway (Romania)
 CFR Line 800 (Bucharest – Mangalia)
 Anghel Saligny Bridge
 List of bridges in Romania

References

External links
Cernavoda Bridge at Structurae
Borcea Bridge at Structurae

Bridges in Romania
Bridges over the Danube
Buildings and structures in Constanța County
Buildings and structures in Ialomița County
Steel bridges
Truss bridges
Road-rail bridges
Railway bridges in Romania
Bridges completed in 1987
1987 establishments in Romania